Fulfillingness' First Finale is the seventeenth studio album by American singer-songwriter Stevie Wonder, released on July 22, 1974 by Tamla, a subsidiary of Motown Records. It is the fourth of five albums from what is considered Wonder's "classic period".

The album was Wonder's second to top the Billboard Top LPs & Tapes chart, where it remained for two weeks, and also reached number one on the Billboard Soul LPs chart, where it spent nine non-consecutive weeks. At the 17th Annual Grammy Awards, it won in three categories, including Wonder's second consecutive win for Album of the Year. Retrospectively, the album was voted number 413 in the third edition of Colin Larkin's All Time Top 1000 Albums (2000) and included in the book 1001 Albums You Must Hear Before You Die.

Recording
Following the epic sweep and social consciousness of Innervisions, Fulfillingness' First Finale, in contrast, projected a more reflective, personal, and decidedly somber tone. While masterly, the musical arrangements used in several songs, especially the bleak "They Won't Go When I Go" and the understated "Creepin, could be considered sparse when compared to those of some of Wonder's other 1970s masterworks. Wonder had not completely foregone social commentary, however, as evidenced by the Billboard Hot 100 number-one single "You Haven't Done Nothin'", which launched a pointed criticism of the Nixon administration bolstered by clavinet, drum machine, and a cameo by the Jackson 5.

Reception

Fulfillingness' First Finale won Grammy Awards for Album of the Year, Best Male Pop Vocal, and Best Male Rhythm and Blues Vocal Performance (for "Boogie On Reggae Woman") at the ceremony held in 1975.

Track listing 
All songs written by Stevie Wonder, except "They Won't Go When I Go", written by Wonder and Yvonne Wright.

Side one
"Smile Please" – 3:26
"Heaven Is 10 Zillion Light Years Away" – 5:01
"Too Shy to Say" – 3:31
"Boogie On Reggae Woman" – 4:54
"Creepin'" – 4:17

Side two
"You Haven't Done Nothin'" – 3:27
"It Ain't No Use" – 3:58
"They Won't Go When I Go" – 5:59
"Bird of Beauty" – 3:46
"Please Don't Go" – 4:06

Personnel
"Smile Please"
Stevie Wonder – lead vocal, background vocal, Fender Rhodes, drums
Michael Sembello – electric guitar
Reggie McBride – electric bass
Bobbye Hall – congas, bongos
Jim Gilstrap – background vocals
Deniece Williams (credited as Denise) – background vocals
"Heaven Is 10 Zillion Years Away"
Stevie Wonder – lead vocal, background vocal, Hohner clavinet, drums, Moog bass
Paul Anka – background vocal
Syreeta Wright – background vocal
Shirley Brewer – background vocal
Larry "Nastyee" Latimer – background vocal
"Too Shy to Say"
Stevie Wonder – lead vocal, piano
James Jamerson – acoustic bass
Sneaky Pete Kleinow – pedal steel guitar
"Boogie On Reggae Woman"
Stevie Wonder – lead vocal, Fender Rhodes, piano, harmonica, drums, Moog bass
Rocky Dzidzornu – congas
"Creepin'"
Stevie Wonder – lead vocal, background vocal, Fender Rhodes, harmonica, drums, Moog bass, T.O.N.T.O. synthesizer
Minnie Riperton – background vocal
"You Haven't Done Nothin"
Stevie Wonder – lead vocal, Hohner clavinet, bass drum, hi-hat, cymbal
Reggie McBride – electric bass
The Jackson 5 – background vocals
Robert Margouleff and Malcolm Cecil – synthesizers
Horns, drum machine – uncredited
"It Ain't No Use"
Stevie Wonder – lead vocal, background vocal, Fender Rhodes, drums, Moog bass
Lani Groves – background vocal
Minnie Riperton – background vocal
Deniece Williams – background vocal
"They Won't Go When I Go"
Stevie Wonder – lead vocal, background vocal, piano, T.O.N.T.O. synthesizer
Bob and Malcolm - programming Moog
"Bird of Beauty"
Stevie Wonder – lead vocal, Fender Rhodes, Hohner clavinet, drums, percussions, Moog bass
Bobbye Hall – cuíca
Shirley Brewer – background vocal
Lani Groves – background vocal
Deniece Williams – background vocal
Sérgio Mendes - Portuguese lyrics
Drum machine - uncredited 
"Please Don't Go"
Stevie Wonder – lead vocal, piano, Fender Rhodes, harmonica, handclaps, drums, hi-hat, Moog bass
Michael Sembello – acoustic guitar
The Persuasions – background vocal
Shirley Brewer – background vocal
Deniece Williams – background vocal

Selected cover versions 
 "Too Shy to Say" - recorded by Diana Ross in 1978.
 "Too Shy to Say" - George Michael performed the song in his Faith Tour.
 "Creepin'" - Recorded by Luther Vandross for The Night I Fell in Love in 1985.
 "They Won't Go When I Go" - recorded by George Michael for Listen Without Prejudice, Vol 1 in 1990.
 "Too Shy to Say" - recorded by Jody Watley for Intimacy in 1993. Released as single in the Philippines.
 "They Won't Go When I Go" - recorded by Kevin Max for The Blood in 2007.
 "They Won't Go When I Go" - recorded by Stefon Harris on the album "Urbanus" in 2009.
 "Boogie On Reggae Woman" - covered that same year by Jamaican reggae singer Pat Rhoden, released as a single only in the UK, produced by Webster Shrowder.
 "Boogie On Reggae Woman" - recorded by Stanley Turrentine on his 1987 album Wonderland.
 "Boogie On Reggae Woman" - recorded by Jerry Garcia and Merl Saunders on Legion of Mary: The Jerry Garcia Collection, Vol. 1.
 "Boogie On Reggae Woman" - regularly performed live by Phish and featured on Hampton Comes Alive (1999), among other concert recordings.
 "Boogie On Reggae Woman" - recorded by Marcus Miller on Silver Rain in 2005.
 "Boogie On Reggae Woman" - recorded by Vulfpeck, featuring singer Antwaun Stanley in 2015
 "You Haven't Done Nothing" - recorded by Curumin for Achados e Perdidos in 2005.

Charts

Weekly charts

Singles

See also
List of number-one albums of 1974 (U.S.)
List of number-one R&B albums of 1974 (U.S.)

References

External links
 Hughes, Tim. Extensive musicological analysis of "You Haven't Done Nothing" in Groove and Flow: Six Analytical Essays On The Music Of Stevie Wonder (University of Washington PhD dissertation, 2003)
 Stevie Wonder interview by Pete Lewis, 'Blues & Soul' March 1995

Stevie Wonder albums
1974 albums
Grammy Award for Album of the Year
Grammy Award for Best Male Pop Vocal Performance
Tamla Records albums
Albums recorded at Electric Lady Studios
Albums produced by Stevie Wonder
Albums produced by Malcolm Cecil
Albums recorded at Record Plant (Los Angeles)
Albums recorded at Westlake Recording Studios